Aurora is a 1984 Italian made-for-television drama film directed by Maurizio Ponzi and starring Sophia Loren, Edoardo Ponti and Daniel J. Travanti. In order to raise money for an operation for her son, a woman tells various former wealthy lovers that they are his father. The film originally premiered in the United States on NBC on October 21, 1984 and released theatrically in Italy on January 17, 1985.

Plot
A desperate woman (Loren), in crisis and poverty, is in search of the cruel husband (Noiret) who abandoned after giving her a son. The boy has now become almost an adult has a serious eye problem and is likely to become completely blind. The mother then choose to leave to go in search of his father, who in the meantime is starting a new life. When the mother finds out where he is, also learns that the cruel man has remade a family by marrying a young girl, who became the mother of a twenty-year-old son who has had the cruel man from another relationship.

Cast
 Sophia Loren as Aurora
 Edoardo Ponti as Aurora's Son
 Daniel J. Travanti as David Ackermann
 Angela Goodwin as Nurse
 Ricky Tognazzi as Michele Orcini
 Marisa Merlini as Teresa
 Anna Strasberg as Angela Feretti
 Franco Fabrizi as Guelfo
 Philippe Noiret as Dr. André Feretti
 Antonio Allocca as Taxi Driver
 David Cameron as Floyd
 Vittorio Duse as Mechanic
 Jorge Krimer as Priest
 Gianfranco Amoroso as Gasoline Attendant
 Alessandra Mussolini as Bride

References

External links
 

1984 films
1984 television films
1984 drama films
Italian drama films
Films directed by Maurizio Ponzi
Films scored by Georges Delerue
1980s Italian films